Formiga Esporte Clube, commonly known as Formiga, is a currently inactive Brazilian football club based in Formiga, Minas Gerais state.

History
The club was founded on May 7, 1929. The club won the Campeonato dos Campeões do Interior in 1950, Campeonato Mineiro Second Level in 1965, and the Campeonato Mineiro do Interior in 1967.

Achievements

 Campeonato Mineiro Second Level:
 Winners (1): 1965
 Campeonato Mineiro do Interior:
 Winners (1): 1967
 Campeonato dos Campeões do Interior:
 Winners (1): 1950

Stadium
Formiga Esporte Clube play their home games at Estádio Juca Pedro. The stadium has a maximum capacity of 2,500 people.

References

Association football clubs established in 1929
Football clubs in Minas Gerais
1929 establishments in Brazil